Christeen is the oldest oyster sloop in the United States and was declared a National Historic Landmark in 1992.

She was built in 1883 in Glenwood Landing, New York as a gaff-rigged sloop.  She had several homes including Essex, Connecticut, but in 1992 she arrived back in the hamlet of Oyster Bay, New York at the Waterfront Center. Funds were raised and over the next seven years, she was restored and relaunched. She currently serves as a working museum ship, offering educational tours of Oyster Bay and Cold Spring harbor.


History
The Christeen, recognized as a National Historic Landmark, was built in 1883 for Captain William Smith to harvest oysters in Oyster Bay and Cold Spring Harbor. Throughout her long life the Christeen worked in the waters of Greenport, Southhold, Connecticut, and New Jersey. The sloop was named for Captain Smiths 13-year-old wife.

In 1914 an engine was installed and the Christeen was used as a cargo vessel transporting potatoes between Long Island and New London, and furniture and other goods between New York City and the eastern end of Long Island.

From 1958 to 1976 she was a pleasure yacht and finally in 1989 was abandoned and nearly sunk in New London, Connecticut. After being saved by Tradewinds Education Network in Connecticut, the Christeen was donated to the Oyster Bay non-profit organization Friends of the Bay and in 1991 she finally returned home. After surviving 16 major hurricanes, numerous nor'easters, and severe neglect, the Christeen was restored and set sail to work on Oyster Bay Harbor again, this time fulfilling her new mission: to serve as a floating classroom to educate students of all ages about the operation of historic vessels and protection of the marine environment of Oyster Bay and Long Island Sound.

References

External links
Christeen Oyster Sloop, at The Waterfront Center
Short Documentary Film about Christeen

National Historic Landmarks in New York (state)
Landmarks in Oyster Bay (town), New York
Museum ships in New York (state)
Essex, Connecticut
Oyster sloops
Individual sailing vessels
Ships on the National Register of Historic Places in New York (state)
Museums in Nassau County, New York
National Register of Historic Places in Nassau County, New York